The aristocratic House of Borromeo were merchants in San Miniato around 1300 and became bankers in Milan after 1370. Vitaliano de' Vitaliani, who acquired the name of Borromeo from his uncle Giovanni, became the count of Arona in 1445. His descendants played important roles in the politics of the Duchy of Milan and as cardinals in the Catholic Reformation. In 1916 the head of the family was granted the title Prince of Angera by the King of Italy.

The best known members of the family were the cardinals and archbishops of Milan; Carlo (1538–1584), who was canonized by Pope Paul V in 1610, and Federico (1564–1631), who founded the Ambrosian Library. The figure of the Borromean rings, which forms part of the family's coat of arms, is well known in the diverse fields of topology, psychoanalysis and theology.

History
Around 1300 this was one of a number of merchant families in San Miniato to carry the name "'Buon Romei'" (or 'Borromei') because of their origins from the city of Rome.

The first member of the family to come to prominence was Filippo who, backed by Holy Roman Emperor Charles IV and Gian Galeazzo Visconti (later to become Duke of Milan), led the Ghibellines of San Miniato in their 1367 revolt against the Florentine Guelphs. In 1370 he was taken prisoner by the Florentines and decapitated. He left five children who had taken refuge in Milan at the time of the revolt. The sons Borromeo and Giovanni founded the Borromei Bank at Milan, with other family members running banks in Venice and Florence.

Filippo Buonromei married Talda di Tenda, sister of Beatrice di Tenda (the hero of a tragic opera by Vincenzo Bellini and wife of the Milanese duke Filippo Maria Visconti). Filippo's daughter Margherita Borromeo († 1429) married Giacobino Vitaliani († 1409), a patrician from Padua, their son Vitaliano Vitaliani (1390-1449) was adopted in 1406 by his childless uncle Giovanni Borromeo, the owner of the Milan bank. The Vitaliani family traces its origins back to Giovanni dei Vitaliani in the 11th century and had been Lords of Bosco, Bojone und Sant'Angelo since c. 1100. In 1418 Vitaliano I Borromeo became treasurer of his uncle, duke Filippo Maria, who also made him Count of Arona in 1446. He acquired the fiefs and castles of Arona and in 1449 of Angera on the banks of Lago Maggiore. (The castle of Angera is still today owned by the family.) Ever since, the Borromeos were the leading land owners (and at times Milanese governors) around the Lago Maggiore.

Vitaliano Borromeo († 1449) had built a castle at Peschiera Borromeo near Milan in 1437. In 1450 Francesco I Sforza was backed by the family in his struggle to become heir and successor of the Visconti dukes and used the castle as a base for his siege of Milan. When he became duke, his gratitude for the family's services overwhelmed them with rewards and honors, among which was the title of a count of Peschiera  for Vitaliano's son Filippo Borromeo (1419–1464) in 1461. Filippo expanded the bank as far as Bruges and London. The business was run at least until 1455.

In 1520 Ludovico Borromeo built the castle Rocca Vitaliana at Castelli di Cannero, a fortification against the Old Swiss Confederacy. Giberto II Borromeo († 1558), Milanese governor at the Lago Maggiore, married Margherita Medici di Marignano, the sister of pope Pius IV and of condottiero Gian Giacomo Medici, Duke of Marignano. One of their sons, Carlo Borromeo (1538−1584), became a cardinal of the Roman Catholic Church, archbishop of Milan, and a canonized saint.

  
The family has owned the Borromean Islands since the 16th century. The islands have beautiful gardens. Two of the islands have grand palaces, still owned by the family. Vitaliano Borromeo built a summer palace on the Isola Bella for his wife Isabella between 1650 and 1671 which was later enlarged by cardinal Giberto III. (1615–1672) and count Vitaliano VI. (1620–1690). Count Carlo IV. (1657–1734) had the garden terraces added. The family still owns the majority of the Borromean Islands.

The "State" of the Borromeo
Between the fourteenth century and the seventeenth centuries the Borromeo were able to gain control of many fiefs in the Valdossola/Lake Maggiore area. They organised them as an almost independent state within the Duchy of Milan obtaining sovereignty, jurisdictions and control over the local army and fortresses. The "State" was subdivided in ten podesterie: Mergozzo, Omegna, Vogogna, Val Vigezzo, Cannobio, Intra, Laveno, Lesa, Angera and Arona. The Podestà of Arona was the main justice administrator for the Borromeo Counts over the area and was independent from both the Novara and Milan jurisdictions, the former controllers. The "state" was quite extended, it occupied almost a half of the modern Province of Verbano-Cusio-Ossola with an extension of around one thousand square kilometres. The "Borromeo's State" ended in 1797 with the invasion of Milan by Napoleon Bonaparte who revoked all the Borromeo's privileges and jurisdictions over this area; so the Borromeo maintained there only their ample estates as the Borromean Islands.

Cardinals
Seven cardinals of the Roman Catholic Church were members of the Borromeo family:
Carlo Borromeo (St. Carlo), *1538 †1584
Federico Borromeo, *1564 †1631
Giberto III Borromeo, *1615 †1672
Federico Borromeo, *1617 †1673
Giberto Bartolomeo Borromeo, *1671 †1740
Vitaliano Borromeo, *1720 †1793
Edoardo Borromeo, *1822 †1881

Styles 
 Count of Arona, by decree of the Duke of Milan dated 26 May 1446 for Vitaliano Vitaliani, adopted Borromeo (1390-1449). 
 Count of Peschiera in 1461 for Filippo Borromeo (1419–1464) 
 Marquess of Angera, in 1623 by Philipp IV. of Spain for cardinal Federico Borromeo (1564-1631), confirmed in 1896 by the King of Italy for Conte Giberto Borromeo Arese 
 Prince of Angera, in 1916 by the King of Italy for Conte Giberto Borromeo Arese (in Primogeniture)

Family members
 Vitaliano VI Borromeo (1620-1690), art collector
 Carlo IV Borromeo Arese, 15th Count of Arona, 5th Marquess of Angera (1657-1734), added his mother Giulia Arese's name to his own, became Viceroy of Naples and governor of the Holy Roman Emperor in the Kingdom of Italy
 Giulio Visconti Borromeo Arese (1664-1750), also Viceroy of Naples and Minister plenipotentiary of the Austrian Netherlands.
 Giberto Borromeo Arese (1815-1885), painter

Current members 
In 2004, one current member of the family, Lavinia Borromeo, married John Elkann, the son of Alain Elkann and Margherita Agnelli de Pahlen, head of Fiat and member of the steering committee of the Bilderberg Conferences.

Matilde Borromeo is the wife of Prince Antonius zu Fürstenberg.

Beatrice Borromeo is the wife of Pierre Casiraghi, son of Princess Caroline of Hanover. Beatrice is a well known political journalist in Italy.

Notes

References
www.borromeo.it: A Borromeo Family website.  
Rocca di Angera

Further reading
www.borromeo.it: A Borromeo Family website.  
www.peschieraborromeo.com, Il Castello di Peschiera Borromeo 
Borromeo Genealogy at sardimpex.com
Borromeo Turismo
The Borromeo Family of Cebu

 
Italian noble families
Roman Catholic families